The Hoover Medal is an American engineering prize.

It has been given since 1930 for "outstanding extra-career services by engineers to humanity". The prize is given jointly by the American Institute of Chemical Engineers, American Institute of Mining, Metallurgical, and Petroleum Engineers, American Society of Civil Engineers, Institute of Electrical and Electronics Engineers, and American Society of Mechanical Engineers (ASME), which administers it. It is named for Herbert Hoover, the first recipient, who was an engineer by profession.

Past recipients 
Source:ASME

See also

 List of engineering awards
 List of mechanical engineering awards
 List of awards for contributions to society
 List of awards named after people

References 

Awards established in 1930
Awards of the American Society of Mechanical Engineers
Awards of the American Institute of Mining, Metallurgical, and Petroleum Engineers
Awards of the American Institute of Chemical Engineers
Awards of the American Society of Civil Engineers
IEEE awards
Awards for contributions to society